Florence Matilda Read (1886 – 1973) was an American college president who was raised in Delevan, New York.  She was president of Spelman College from 1927–1953 and wrote a book about the historically black college.

Life and work 
Read received her B.A. from Mount Holyoke College in 1909 and served as alumnae secretary.

In 1911, Read moved to Portland, Oregon where she was secretary to the president of Reed College, a post she held until 1920. During World War I, Read worked at the Council of National Defense in Washington, D.C. and later with the YMCA in France.

From 1920 to 1927, Read served as executive secretary of the International Health Division of the Rockefeller Foundation.

Spelman College 
In 1927, Read was named President of Spelman College a historically black college for women in Atlanta. During her time as president, enrollment almost doubled and the college's reputation in the liberal arts was enhanced. On April 11, 1929, which was also Spelman's 48th celebration of Founder's Day, Read was a co-signer of the Agreement of Affiliation between Spelman College, Morehouse College and Atlanta University. That agreement was signed in President Read's office, and the signees breakfasted together afterward.

While she was president at Spelman, she also became superintendent of Atlanta University and helped make arrangements to incorporate women students at Atlanta University into the Spelman student body and college community.

Later years 
Read was elected Spelman's President Emeritus when she retired in 1953. In 1955, she researched what would later become her history of Spelman College while living in South Hadley, Massachusetts. Read died in 1973.

Honors and awards 
 Read was awarded an honorary degree by Oberlin College in 1939.
 In 1961 Reed College awarded her an honorary degree.
 In 1962, Mount Holyoke College bestowed on her the Alumnae Medal of Honor.

Written work
The Story of Spelman College. Atlanta, Georgia (1961)

References

External links

 
 

Mount Holyoke College alumni
1886 births
1973 deaths
Heads of universities and colleges in the United States
20th-century American academics